Will Rock is a first-person shooter developed by Saber Interactive and published by Ubisoft. The game was released in North America on June 9, 2003. The game is the first game developed by Saber Interactive. It received mixed reviews, with critics comparing the game unfavorably to Serious Sam.

Plot
With the aid and powers of the titan Prometheus, Will Rock rampages through Lost Olympus, seeking the safe return of his love, Emma, and revenge for the murder of his mentor, Dr. Headstrong. Prometheus, fusing his spirit into Will's able body, seeks to wage a bloody vendetta against the god Zeus, who robbed him of physical form long ago. Half mortal, half Titan, Will Rock will stop at nothing short of toppling the pillar of the gods to wreak vengeance of mythic proportions, and to save a terrified woman in the name of love. They don't have much time, though on the eve of the next thunderstorm, Zeus will be able to take a new wife and this time his sights are set on a mortal: Emma Headstrong.

Gameplay 
The game is a first-person shooter, with the player having control over the main protagonist, Will Rock. The player can use 11 different weapons in combat. The single-player mode of the game has 10 levels, and there are different multiplayer modes in the game.

Reception

The game received "mixed" reviews according to the review aggregation website Metacritic. Chris Hudak of IGN gave the game a score of 7.2/10, praising the graphics and gameplay. GameSpot criticized the game for being a mindless knockoff of Serious Sam in a more negative review.

References

External links

Ubisoft games
Saber Interactive games
2003 video games
First-person shooters
Cooperative video games
Video games developed in the United States
Video games based on Greek mythology
Video games set in Greece
Windows games
Windows-only games